The 2017 ITTF World Tour Grand Finals was the final competition of the 2017 ITTF World Tour, the International Table Tennis Federation's professional table tennis world tour. It was the 22nd edition of the competition, and was held from 14 to 17 December in Astana, Kazakhstan.

The competition featured events in four categories: men's singles, women's singles, men's doubles and women's doubles.

Events

Qualification

Players earned points based on their performances in the singles and doubles tournaments at the 12 events of the 2017 ITTF World Tour. The top 15 men's singles players, the top 16 women's singles players, and the top eight men's and women's doubles pairs who satisfied the qualification criteria were invited to compete. Kazakhstan's Kirill Gerassimenko was the 16th player added to the men's singles event to ensure that the host nation was represented.

Tournament format

The singles and doubles tournaments consisted of knockout draws, with 16 players starting each of the singles events and eight pairs starting each of the doubles events. The seedings for the tournament draws were based on final tour standings, not the official ITTF world ranking.

Men's singles

Players

Draw

Women's singles

Players

Draw

Men's doubles

Players

Draw

Women's doubles

Players

Draw

ITTF Star Awards

The 2017 ITTF Star Awards ceremony was held on the first evening of the Grand Finals at the Rixos President Hotel on 14 December.

Awards were handed out in eight categories:

Male Table Tennis Star:  Timo Boll
Female Table Tennis Star:  Ding Ning
Male Para Table Tennis Star:  Viktor Didukh
Female Para Table Tennis Star:  Neslihan Kavas
Table Tennis Star Coach:  Jörg Roßkopf
Table Tennis Breakthrough Star:  Tomokazu Harimoto
Table Tennis Star Point:  Ding Ning (versus Zhu Yuling at the 2017 World Championships)
Fair Play Star:  Irvin Bertrand

See also

2017 World Table Tennis Championships
2017 ITTF Men's World Cup
2017 ITTF Women's World Cup

References

External links
2017 ITTF World Tour Grand Finals
International Table Tennis Federation

2017
2017 in table tennis
Table tennis competitions in Kazakhstan
International sports competitions hosted by Kazakhstan
Sport in Astana
ITTF